Contradiction Films is a film and television production company with offices in Los Angeles and Austin, which specializes in live-action adaptation of video games, being best known for its Mortal Kombat: Legacy and Dead Rising films.

The company also produces corporate and commercial videos within both the public and private sectors.

Films

References

External links
 Official Website

Film production companies of the United States
Television production companies of the United States
Entertainment companies based in California
Companies based in Los Angeles